Dornești is a commune located in Suceava County, Romania. It is composed of two villages, Dornești and Iaz. From 1786 to 1941, Dornești village was inhabited by the Székelys of Bukovina.

Natives
 Damaschin Dorneanul, Vicar-Bishop of the Archdiocese of Suceava and Rădăuți
 Tamás Menyhért, Hungarian writer

References

Communes in Suceava County
Localities in Southern Bukovina
Székely communities